Rue Saint-Jacques is a street in the Latin Quarter of Paris which lies along the cardo of Roman Lutetia. Boulevard Saint-Michel, driven through this old quarter of Paris by Baron Haussmann, relegated the roughly parallel Rue Saint-Jacques to a backstreet, but it was a main axial road of medieval Paris, as the buildings that still front it attest. It was the starting point for pilgrims leaving Paris to make their way along the Chemin de Saint-Jacques that led eventually to Santiago de Compostela.

The Paris base of the Dominican Order was established in 1218 under the leadership of Pierre Seilhan (or Seila) in the Chapelle Saint-Jacques, close to the Porte Saint-Jacques, on this street; this is why the Dominicans were called Jacobins in Paris. Thus the street's name is indirectly responsible for the Jacobin Club in the French Revolution getting that name (being based in a former Jacobin monastery, itself located elsewhere). Johann Heynlin and Guillaume Fichet established the first printing press in France, briefly at the Sorbonne and then on this street, in the 1470s. The second printers in Paris were Peter Kayser and Johann Stohl at the sign of the Soleil d'Or in Rue Saint-Jacques, from 1473. The proximity of the Sorbonne led many later booksellers and printers to set up shop here also.

Notable sites 
 The Sorbonne
 The Lycée Louis-le-Grand
 The Institut de géographie of Panthéon-Sorbonne University at 191 Rue Saint-Jacques
 No 163 bis, Le Port du Salut, an inn of the 18th century, had a cabaret where many artistes made their debuts: Guy Béart, Barbara, Georges Moustaki, Pierre Perret, Jean Yanne, Coluche, Serge Gainsbourg, Boby Lapointe between 1955 and 1982.
 No 195, Institut océanographique
 No 252, the Église Saint-Jacques-du-Haut-Pas, in the Classical style, once a centre of Jansenism, burial place of the astronomer Cassini (built between 1670 and 1684 to the designs of Erard and of Daniel Gittard).
 No 244, associated with André Salmon and the revue Le Festin d'Esope, founded by him and his friends , Apollinaire and others.

Notes